Colombian Latin rock singer-songwriter Juanes has sold an estimated 15 million records worldwide.

Albums

Studio albums

Live albums

Singles

As lead artist

As featured artist 

Notes
A.  "A Dios le Pido" has been released on two separate occasions – 2002 release in Latin America and the United States, and the final re-release was on 2005 in Europe as second single of his third studio album Mi Sangre. The song did not enter the Billboard Hot 100, but peaked at number 19 on the Bubbling Under Hot 100 Singles chart.
B.  "Fotografía" did not enter the Billboard Hot 100, but peaked at number 16 on the Bubbling Under Hot 100 Singles chart.
C.  "Nada Valgo Sin Tu Amor" did not enter the Billboard Hot 100, but peaked at number 4 on the Bubbling Under Hot 100 Singles chart.
D.  "Gotas de Agua Dulce" did not enter the Billboard Hot 100, but peaked at number 2 on the Bubbling Under Hot 100 Singles chart.
E.  "Odio por Amor" did not enter the Billboard Hot 100, but peaked at number 25 on the Bubbling Under Hot 100 Singles chart.
F.  "Yerbatero" did not enter the Billboard Hot 100, but peaked at number 17 on the Bubbling Under Hot 100 Singles chart.
G.  "La Señal" did not enter the Billboard Hot 100, but peaked at number 19 on the Bubbling Under Hot 100 Singles chart.

Other certified songs

Guest appearances

Music videos

References

Discography
Juanes
Discographies of Colombian artists
Pop music discographies
Rock music discographies